Gharatwadi is a village in the Karmala taluka of Solapur district in Maharashtra state, India.

Demographics
Covering  and comprising 97 households at the time of the 2011 census of India, Gharatwadi had a population of 424. There were 220 males and 204 females, with 55 people being aged six or younger.

References

Villages in Karmala taluka